Partir, revenir is a 1985 French film directed by Claude Lelouch.

Cast and roles
 Annie Girardot - Hélène Rivière
 Jean-Louis Trintignant - Roland Rivière
 Françoise Fabian - Sarah Lerner
 Erik Berchot - Salomon Lerner
 Michel Piccoli - Simon Lerner
 Évelyne Bouix - Salomé Lerner
 Richard Anconina - Vincent Rivière
 Charles Gérard - Tenardon
 Jean Bouise - The priest
 Monique Lange - Salomé in 1985
 Marie-Sophie L. - Angéla
 Denis Lavant - Simon Lerner's patient
 Ginette Garcin - The servant of the priest
 Isabelle Sadoyan - Anna, the servant of the Rivières
 Dominique Pinon - A villager
 Bernard Pivot - Himself
 Henri Amouroux - Himself

External links
 IMDb entry

1985 films
French war drama films
Films directed by Claude Lelouch
1980s French films